95.1 Brigada News FM (DXZD 95.1 MHz) is an FM station owned and operated by Brigada Mass Media Corporation. Its studios and transmitter are located at National Highway, Brgy. Tambo, Iligan.

References

External links
Brigada News FM Iligan FB Page
Brigada News FM Iligan Website

Radio stations in Iligan
Radio stations established in 1993